Ulrike Deppe (9 December 1953 in Lippstadt) is a former West German slalom canoeist who competed at the international level from 1969 to 1983.

She won three medals in the K1 event at the ICF Canoe Slalom World Championships with a gold (1981) and two silvers (1969, 1975). She also won two golds (1969, 1981) and two silvers (1971, 1979) in the K1 team event at the World Championships.

Deppe finished seventh in the K1 event at the 1972 Summer Olympics in Munich.

References

1953 births
Canoeists at the 1972 Summer Olympics
West German female canoeists
Living people
Olympic canoeists of West Germany
Medalists at the ICF Canoe Slalom World Championships
People from Lippstadt
Sportspeople from Arnsberg (region)